Saint Joseph Central Catholic High School is a private, Catholic high school in Ironton, Ohio.  It is operated by the Roman Catholic Diocese of Steubenville. The school's sports teams are known as the Flyers. In addition to housing the high school grades of 9-12, the school also houses junior high grades 7–8.

References

External links
 

High schools in Lawrence County, Ohio
Catholic secondary schools in Ohio
Ironton, Ohio
Private middle schools in Ohio